Zachary Cole Smith (born November 7, 1984) is an American musician, model and music video director, best known for being the founder, frontman, and principal songwriter of the indie rock band DIIV. He first began playing in bands like Soft Black and Beach Fossils after moving to New York City in the late 2000s. Initially called Dive, the band started as Smith's solo recording project. Smith released his debut studio album with DIIV,  Oshin, in 2012, which combined elements of krautrock, post-punk and shoegaze. He has directed music videos for DIIV and Sky Ferreira. Outside of his work in the music industry, Smith has modeled for Saint Laurent on multiple occasions. DIIV's second studio album, Is the Is Are, was released on February 5, 2016. On October 4, 2019, DIIV's third album, Deceiver, was released on Captured Tracks.

Early life 
Smith was born in New York City on November 7, 1984. His father, also named Zachary, is a musician and songwriter. His mother, Deborah E. MacIntyre, was a fashion editor for Vogue magazine.

Smith had disciplinary problems as a teenager and was often suspended during middle school. When Smith was a freshman in high school, he and a friend went out looking for cigarettes and eventually smashed truck windows with rocks in the parking lot of a Wal-Mart. Both boys were arrested, and Smith was expelled from school. He also began playing the guitar during that time. After that, he attended six different schools in five years, including St. Luke's School (New Canaan, Connecticut) and The Beekman School (Manhattan, New York), and finally graduated from Wooster School in Danbury, Connecticut.

Career 
After moving to New York City, Smith was introduced to a community of musicians and began playing guitar in Soft Black around 2009. During that time, he met Dustin Payseur and played drums in Beach Fossils for a short time. In 2010, he rejoined them as a guitar player and began recording solo material. Prior to 2011, Smith had also toured and played guitar with the indie band Darwin Deez.

Smith began writing songs himself in 2010. In the summer of 2011, he booked a show for his project Dive and asked Andrew Bailey, Devin Ruben Perez and Colby Hewitt to join him. They eventually renamed themselves DIIV, were signed by Captured Tracks and released several singles. Their debut album, Oshin, was released in 2012. Smith co-directed the music video for "Doused", which was released in September of that year.

Smith was signed by Re:Quest Model Management in the summer of 2013, and along with Cara Delevingne, was photographed by Hedi Slimane for Saint Laurent's Fall 2013 campaign in May of that year. In June, he walked in Saint Laurent's spring 2014 menswear fashion show during Paris Fashion Week. Smith directed the music video for Sky Ferreira's song "Omanko", which was released in December 2014.

In May 2015, Smith was featured in an episode of Noisey's "Under the Influence" series detailing the influence of krautrock on contemporary music. Smith walked in Saint Laurent's Spring 2016 menswear runway show in June 2015.

DIIV released their second studio album, Is the Is Are, on February 5, 2016, and then on October 4, 2019, their third album, Deceiver.

Musical style and influences 

Smith's work with DIIV has been described as krautrock, post-punk and shoegaze.

Smith's favorite albums include Arthur Russell's Love Is Overtaking Me (2008), Red Krayola's The Parable of Arable Land (1967) and Faust's The Faust Tapes (1973). The songs on Oshin were influenced by German psychedelic bands such as Kluster, La Düsseldorf, Neu! and Can. Additionally, Smith cited Nirvana and world music as sources of inspiration. According to Smith, Is the Is Are was influenced by Elliott Smith and Royal Trux.

Philanthropy 
On July 9, 2014, DIIV performed as Ferreira's opening act at a concert benefiting the David Lynch Foundation. The proceeds went to support "Transcendental Meditation (TM) programs for at-risk students; veterans with PTSD (post-traumatic stress disorder) [sic]; women who are survivors of domestic violence; American Indians suffering from diabetes; the homeless and incarcerate." As part of a fundraiser for the "immersive theater performance" Houseworld, DIIV offered to re-enact a donor’s dream in exchange for a donation of $10,000 in October 2015.

Personal life 
In 2004, Smith began attending Hampshire College in Amherst, Massachusetts to study music and film. He never graduated or produced a final DIV III. He worked construction and landscaping jobs in Northampton.

Smith landed a job at Angelica Kitchen, an East Village restaurant that’s been serving vegan food to artists and hippies since the ’70s. Through work, he started connecting with New York’s thriving underground music scene. If hungry musicians came in looking for free food, Smith would share what he could. While he’d played guitar since he was a small child, even starting a short-lived band with Bailey and another friend in high school, he says he’d always considered it more of a hobby than a calling. In an interview with The Fader, he said “It was just something I knew how to do.” It wasn’t until 2010, after a couple years playing in the local psych rock band Soft Black and the well-liked jangle-pop outfit Beach Fossils, that Smith, then 26, decided to start writing his own rock songs.

Smith was in a relationship with singer and model Sky Ferreira. On September 13, 2013—the night before DIIV was scheduled to perform at Basilica Soundscape, a three-day music festival held inside a renovated 19th century factory in Hudson, New York—Smith’s unregistered Ford pickup truck was pulled over in the nearby town of Saugerties. Smith had heroin on him, and Sky Ferreira reportedly had ecstasy—although her charges were later dropped entirely. After Ferreira made bail, she spent several traumatic hours waiting for Smith, completely alone inside the sparsely furnished one-floor Catskill house without food, heat, or internet.  Smith was charged with "two counts of criminal possession of a controlled substance, one count of possession of stolen property and one count of aggravated unlicensed driving, all misdemeanors". Additionally, he was charged with "violations of unregistered motor vehicle, driving without insurance, unlicensed driver, and having an inadequate exhaust system". Smith was in possession of "42 decks" of heroin and his bail was set at $2,500. He was ordered to go to rehab for 11 days in January 2014.

Smith is currently a vegan. He recently lived in Catskill, New York until moving back to New York City in 2015.

On February 3, 2017, Smith announced he was checking in for "long-haul" inpatient treatment.

On February 9, 2020, Smith married his longtime girlfriend Dani Nelson. The ceremony was held at the Bob Baker Marionette Theater in Highland Park, CA. The ceremony was attended by their families and close friends, including members of DIIV, Beach Fossils, Deafheaven, Mac Demarco, and Launder. Andrew Bailey, current guitarist for DIIV and whom Smith has been best friends with since they were 13, served as Smith's best man.

Bands 

 Soft Black (Guitarist 2009)
 Beach Fossils (Drummer 2010, guitarist 2011–2012)
 Darwin Deez (Guitarist 2010)
 DIIV (Guitarist, vocals 2011–present)
 Launder (Live guitarist 2019)

Discography
with DIIV

 Oshin (2012)
 Is the Is Are (2016)
 Deceiver (2019)

with Launder

 Pink Cloud EP (2018)
 Powder/Chew single (2019)

References

External links 
 Zachary Cole Smith at Models.com

1984 births
Male models from New York (state)
American music video directors
American rock guitarists
American male guitarists
Alternative rock guitarists
American rock singers
Hampshire College alumni
Lead guitarists
Living people
Singers from Connecticut
American post-punk musicians
Shoegaze musicians
Guitarists from Connecticut
Guitarists from New York City
21st-century American singers
21st-century American guitarists
21st-century American male singers